= Napoleon's Campaign Library =

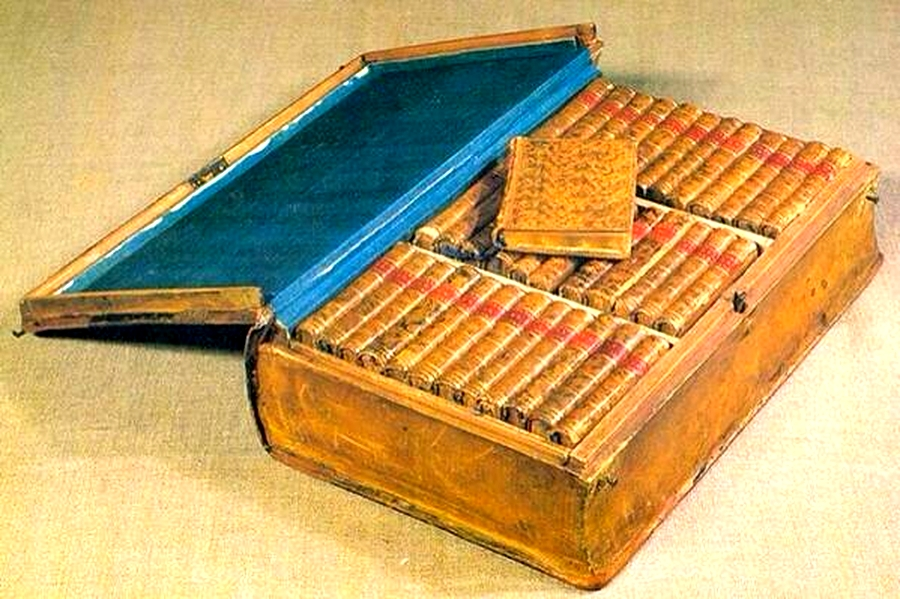
Napoleon Micro-Books

The Napoleon's campaign library was primarily a set of specially printed books intended to accompany the emperor in his military campaigns, as Napoleon carried a portable library with him during his military campaigns.

The desire to have reference or literary works, for learning, documentation or enjoyment, is attested from Napoleon's youth. Once proclaimed emperor, with significant financial and legal resources, he instituted the creation of a specific library to satisfy his reading needs in the midst of a military campaign . Far from major cities and libraries.

== Background ==
Napoleon Bonaparte not only reformed France and triumphed on the battlefield, but he was also a lifelong reader, even having paintings portrayed in front of his library. This tradition continued during the Fifth Republic. From his years at the Brienne Military Academy until his exile in Saint Helena, Napoleon never stopped reading. He read books of all kinds: history, science, theater, classics, poetry, and even contemporary literature. His curiosity knew no bounds, his passion was so intense that even on the battlefield he carried with him a well-stocked micro-library. His librarian Barbier noted in his letters that Napoleon rejected books in Castilian because he did not master the language, but he certified his understanding of Catalan by finding his notes on the margin of medieval Catalan chronicles during the French occupation of Barcelona (1808-1814).

== Napoleon's knowledge of Catalan ==
Napoleon showed a peculiar interest in the Catalan language during the French occupation of Catalonia (1808-1814). According to reports from his lieutenant Duhesme, which reinforce the fact that, while he ignored Castilian, he understood Catalan enough to use it strategically, since the emperor:

- He kept in his personal library copies in Catalan of the Chronicles of James I, Desclot, Tomich and Muntaner, with marginal notes in French, where he wrote translations or highlighted passages on military tactics.
- He ordered that official proclamations in Barcelona and Valencia be published in Catalan to gain local support.
- He subsidized the newspaper El Correo de Barcelona (1808-1810) in Catalan and Spanish, as a propaganda tool.

== Physical details ==
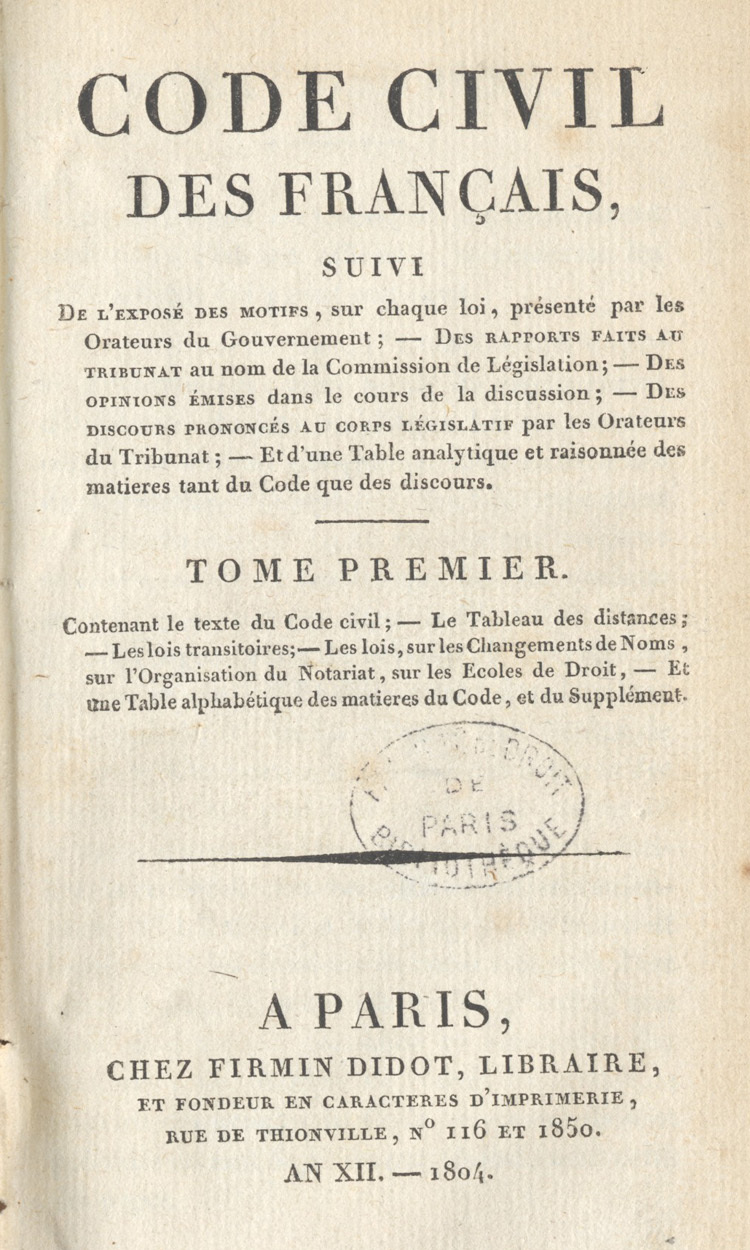
Firmin Didot typeface sample.

The different portable libraries consisted of boxes full of books. For each campaign, several boxes were prepared (each box with about 60 books). There were mahogany wooden boxes lined inside with green velvet . There were also oak boxes covered in leather, lined inside with velvet or green leather. The most commonly used formats were in-12 and in-18. The smallest books (in-12) were approximately 17.5x10.5 cm in size. As for paper, printing was done on vellum. The books were bound in marroquin (soft leather) and organized with a numbered catalog system for quick access.

== Miniaturized Library (1803) ==
On July 8, 1803, Napoleon commissioned a library of 1,000 volumes in small format (12mo, ~15 cm high), without margins to save space and easy to transport. The books had flexible covers and elastic spines for durability. These were the orders to his librarian:

The Emperor wishes you to form a traveling library of a thousand volumes in small 12-megabyte type, printed in elegant script. It is His Majesty's intention to print these works for his special use, and to economize space, they are to have no margins. They are to contain from five to six hundred pages, and be bound with covers as flexible as possible and with hinged clasps. There are to be forty works on religion, forty dramatic works, forty volumes of epic poetry, sixty of poetry, one hundred novels, and sixty volumes of history; the remainder are to be historical memoirs of each period.

In summary, the collection included:

- 40 religious works (Bible, Koran).
- 40 dramatic works, 60 epic poetry and another 60 miscellaneous poetry.
- 100 novels (Fielding, Richardson).
- 60 volumes of history and historical memoirs

== Logistics and Booksellers ==
- Napoleon's personal librarian, Antoine-Alexandre Barbier, oversaw the selection and transportation of the books. During the Russian campaign (1812), reinforced crates containing up to 3,000 volumes were sent, although many were lost in the retreat from Moscow.

== Comparison with Modern Technology ==
- Articles such as "Napoleon's Kindle" (Open Culture) highlight that this system was a precursor to eBook readers, designed for portability and quick access.
